Clanculus brunneus is a species of sea snail, a marine gastropod mollusk in the family Trochidae, the top snails.

Description
The size of the shell varies between 13 mm and 15 mm. The shell has a depressed-conic shape. It is dark brown, adorned with colored bands with granules. The interstices are longitudinally elevated. The whorls are flat, the last one is sharply angulate. The umbilicus has a flat margin. The columella is transversely oblique with a tasseled margin. It terminates in a biplicated tooth. The inner lip shows fine linear elevations, with the last lira the largest.

Distribution
This marine species is endemic to Australia and occurs off New South Wales.

References

 Adams, A. 1853. Contributions towards a monograph of the Trochidae, a family of gastropodous Mollusca. Proceedings of the Zoological Society of London 1851(19): 150-192 
 Adams, H. & Adams, A. 1854. The genera of Recent Mollusca arranged according to their organization. London : John Van Voorst Vol. 1 pp. 257–484
 Angas, G.F. 1867. A list of species of marine Mollusca found in Port Jackson harbour, New South Wales and on the adjacent coasts, with notes on their habits etc. Proceedings of the Zoological Society of London 1867: 185-233, 912-935 
 Iredale, T. & McMichael, D.F. 1962. A reference list of the marine Mollusca of New South Wales. Memoirs of the Australian Museum 11: 1-109
 Tapparone-Canefri, C.M 1873. Malacologia in "Zoologia del viaggio intorno al globo della regia fregata Magenta durante gli anni 1865–68". Zoologia Magenta 162 pp. 4 pls  
 Fischer, P. 1877. Genres Calcar, Trochus, Xenophora, Tectarius et Risella. pp. 115-240 in Keiner, L.C. (ed.). Spécies general et iconographie des coquilles vivantes. Paris : J.B. Baillière Vol. 11
 Watson, R.B. 1886. Report on the Scaphopoda and Gastropoda collected by the H.M.S. "Challenger" during the years 1873-1876. Report on the Scientific Results of the Voyage of H.M.S. Challenger 1873–1876, Zoology 15(42): 756 pp., 50 pls 
 Brazier, J. 1889. Notes and critical remarks on a donation of shells sent to the Museum of the Conchological Society of Great Britain and Ireland. Journal of Conchology 6: 66-84
 Whitelegge, T. 1889. List of the Marine and Freshwater Invertebrate Fauna of Port Jackson and the Neighbourhood. Journal and Proceedings of the Royal Society of New South Wales 23: 1-161  
 Henn, A.U. & Brazier, J.W. 1894. List of Mollusca found at Green Point, Watson's Bay, Sydney. With a few remarks upon some of the most interesting species and descriptions of new species. Proceedings of the Linnean Society of New South Wales 2 9: 165-182 
 Hedley, C. 1918. A checklist of the marine fauna of New South Wales. Part 1. Journal and Proceedings of the Royal Society of New South Wales 51: M1-M120
 Iredale, T. 1924. Results from Roy Bell's molluscan collections. Proceedings of the Linnean Society of New South Wales 49(3): 179-279, pl. 33-36 
 Iredale, T. & McMichael, D.F. 1962. A reference list of the marine Mollusca of New South Wales. Memoirs of the Australian Museum 11: 1-109 
 Wilson, B. 1993. Australian Marine Shells. Prosobranch Gastropods. Kallaroo, Western Australia : Odyssey Publishing Vol. 1 408 pp.
 Jansen, P. 1995. A review of the genus Clanculus Montfort, 1810 (Gastropoda: Trochidae) in Australia, with description of a new subspecies and the introduction of a nomen novum. Vita Marina 43(1-2): 39-62

External links
 To Biodiversity Heritage Library (4 publications)
 To World Register of Marine Species
 

brunneus
Gastropods described in 1853